Pierce Township is one of the fourteen townships of Clermont County, Ohio, United States. The 2010 census reported 14,349 people living in the township, 10,968 of whom were in the unincorporated portions of the township.

Geography
Located in the western part of the county along the Ohio River, it borders the following townships:
Union Township - north
Batavia Township - northeast
Monroe Township - southeast
Ohio Township - south
Anderson Township, Hamilton County - northwest
Campbell County, Kentucky lies across the Ohio River to the southwest.

Parts of the former village of Amelia (dissolved in 2019) are located in eastern Pierce Township, and part of the census-designated place of Withamsville is located in the township's north.

Name and history
It is the only Pierce Township statewide.

Pierce Township was established in 1853.

Government
The township is governed by a three-member board of trustees, who are elected in November of odd-numbered years to a four-year term beginning on the following January 1. Two are elected in the year after the presidential election and one is elected in the year before it. There is also an elected township fiscal officer, who serves a four-year term beginning on April 1 of the year after the election, which is held in November of the year before the presidential election. Vacancies in the fiscal officership or on the board of trustees are filled by the remaining trustees.

References

External links
Township website
County website

Townships in Clermont County, Ohio